Helena von Zweigbergk (born 18 February 1959, Stockholm) is a Swedish journalist, author and film critic. She is known for the radio program, Spanarna, and SVT Filmkrönikan. She has written a number of crime novels around the character Ingrid Carlberg, a prison chaplain. In 2014, she won the competition På spåret.

Selected works

1994 - Priset man betalar för att slippa kärlek (with Cecilia Bodström)
2001 - Måste vara en prinsessa (children's book, illustrated by Jens Ahlbom)
2001 - Det Gud inte såg
2003 - Kärleken skär djupa spår
2004 - Hon som bar skammen
2004 - Svarta diamanter: elva berättelser om liv och död (anthology together with Carina Burman and others)
2005 - Tusen skärvor tillit
2006 - Fly för livet
2008 - Ur vulkanens mun
2009 - Sånt man bara säger
2012 - Anna och Mats bor inte här längre
2013 - Än klappar hjärtan

External links

1959 births
Living people
Writers from Stockholm
Swedish journalists
Swedish crime fiction writers
Swedish film critics